This is the discography of former Indian male playback singer Sirkazhi Govindarajan, who sang in over 900 songs in Tamil films. He mostly sang in Tamil Film Songs and Devotional Songs. He gave his voice to actors and thespians in the Tamil film industry such as M. G. Ramachandran, Gemini Ganesan, S. S. Rajendran, R. Muthuraman, K. A. Thangavelu, V. Nagayya, Prem Nazir, Kalyan Kumar, Nagesh In addition to various other known and unknown heroes and supporting actors like R. S. Manohar, S. V. Subbaiah, Kannadasan, Kuladeivam Rajagopal, Major Sundarrajan, Thengai Srinivasan, Suruli Rajan, Master Prabhakar.

Collaboration

Music composers
A. M. Rajah, S. V. Venkataraman, S. M. Subbaiah Naidu, S. Rajeswara Rao, S. Dakshinamurthi, V. Dakshinamoorthy, G. Ramanathan, C. N. Pandurangan, Master Venu, M. S. Viswanathan, T. K. Ramamoorthy, K. V. Mahadevan, Kunnakudi Vaidyanathan, Ghantasala, B. Narasimma Rao, A. Rama Rao, T. Chalapathi Rao, T. G. Lingappa, P. Adinarayana Rao, T. R. Pappa, Vedha, G. K. Venkatesh, V. Kumar, C. Ramachandra, Ilaiyaraaja and Shankar–Ganesh.

Playback singers
He has sung with other male singers such as Thiruchi Loganathan, M. S. Viswanathan, T. M. Soundararajan, P. B. Sreenivas, Ghantasala, S. C. Krishnan, A. L. Raghavan, S. V. Ponnusamy and K. J. Yesudas.

He has sung duets with many female singers such as M. L. Vasanthakumari, P. Leela, Jikki, K. Jamuna Rani, K. Rani, P. Susheela, L. R. Eswari, L. R. Anjali, M. S. Rajeswari, Soolamagalam Rajalaskhmi, Soolamangalam Jayalaskhmi, R. Balasaraswathi, N. L. Ganasaraswathi, A. P. Komala, A. G. Rathnamala, T. V. Rathnam, Bangalore A. R. Ramani Ammal, Vani Jayaram, S. Janaki, M. R. Vijaya, Sarala and Rohini.

He sang duets with singing actors such as N. S. Krishnan, T. R. Mahalingam, S. Varalakshmi, P. Bhanumathi and Manorama.

Awards

Honorary and major awards
 Honorary Doctorate (Honoris Causa) by Madras University, Tamil Nadu in 1983.
 Padmashri award by Government of India

Tamil Nadu State Film Awards

List of films discography

1950s

1960s

1970s

1980s

References

External links

Article on Seerkazhi Govindarajan in Kalyana Malai
Three Gifted Voices of a Golden Era in My Movie Minutes

Discographies of Indian artists
Lists of songs recorded by Indian singers